Moriah is a hamlet in the community of Llanfarian, Ceredigion, Wales, which is 73 miles (117.4 km) from Cardiff and 177.1 miles (285 km) from London. Moriah is represented in Ceredigion County Council by Alun Lloyd Jones (Plaid Cymru), in the Senedd by Elin Jones (Plaid Cymru; 1999–present) and the Member of Parliament is Ben Lake (Plaid Cymru; 2017–present).

References

See also
List of localities in Wales by population 

Villages in Ceredigion